What Are We Doing may refer to:

"What Are We Doing", a song by The Kinks from UK Jive (1989)
"What Are We Doing", a song by B.o.B. from Strange Clouds (2012)
"What Are We Doing", a song by Danielle Bradbery from I Don't Believe We've Met (2017)

See also
What Are We Doing Here? (disambiguation)